Alexander Vladimirovich Varlamov (1904-1990) was a Russian Soviet jazz composer and arranger. He was also the conductor of the jazz orchestra with the All-Union Radio Committee, along with being a singer and the leader of the leading Jazz orchestras in the Soviet Union, called the State Jazz Orchestra of the USSR. Additionally, he is accredited with founding the first ever, Soviet group of musician-improvisers called "The Seven" [Семерка].  He played an instrumental role in popularizing jazz music in Russia during the 1930s and amassed a huge corpus of works during his lifetime, up to 400 compositions include pieces for variety orchestra, songs, and music for films and cartoons. He was the great-grandson of Alexander Egorovich Varlamov. He was awarded the title of Honored Artist of the RSFSR in 1979.

See also 

 The Russian Jazz Quartet
 Soviet jazz

References

Future reading 

 "Варламов Александр Владимирович — Джаз. XX век — Яндекс.Словари". web.archive.org. 2013-01-27. Retrieved 2021-07-21.
 "Исполнитель: Александр Варламов.. | любители музыки психо-прог-арт-этно-блюз-рок | VK". vk.com. Retrieved 2021-07-21.

1904 births
1990 deaths
Russian composers
Russian male composers
Gulag detainees
20th-century Russian conductors (music)
Russian male conductors (music)
20th-century Russian male musicians
20th-century composers
People from Ulyanovsk
Soviet composers
Soviet male composers
Soviet conductors (music)
Honored Artists of the RSFSR